Jacqueline Joan Kim is an American writer, actress, filmmaker and composer. She was nominated for a FIND Independent Spirit award for Best Supporting Actress in the film Charlotte Sometimes.

Early life 
Kim was born in Cincinnati, Ohio, to Korean parents, as the youngest of three girls. She was raised in Bloomfield Hills, Michigan, and started in theatre at age 14, "at a little theatre down the street called 'Willow Way'." She graduated from Bloomfield Hills Lahser High School. She then earned a Bachelor of Fine Arts from the Theatre School at DePaul University in Chicago.

Career 
After graduating from drama school, Kim began acting on stages in Chicago, The Shakespeare Theatre (DC) and eventually landed in Minneapolis. Highlights throughout four seasons at the Guthrie Theater include such roles as Nina in The Seagull, the title role in Electra and Phocion/Princess in The Triumph of Love. At the end of 1993, she moved to Los Angeles and began her film career, landing major roles in two films, Star Trek Generations and Barry Levinson's Disclosure. These roles were followed by work opposite Tommy Lee Jones in Volcano. In 1999, she played Yon Greene, a Bangkok attorney and lawyer for Claire Danes and Kate Beckinsale, in Brokedown Palace. In 2001, she shared the title role in the film The Operator, written and directed by Jon Dichter, co-starring Michael Laurence and Stephen Tobolowsky. Her breakout film and performance was in Eric Byler's Charlotte Sometimes, which film critic Roger Ebert championed and brought to his Overlooked Film Festival. This role was recognized by two FIND Independent Spirit Award nominations for Kim's work as Charlotte and for the film (the John Cassavetes Award).

Kim is also known for her work in the two part epic "The Debt, Part I and II" for the Xena: Warrior Princess television series as Xena's spiritual mentor, Lao Ma. She won the 2004 LA Drama Critics' Circle award for best female lead performance in East West Players' production of Passion. Her roots are in musical theatre. In 2011, she released her first EP, This I Heard (song & melodies, part I).

In 2015, Kim finished production on the film Advantageous. She co-wrote, produced and composed the feature with its director, Jennifer Phang, while starring opposite Jennifer Ehle, James Urbaniak and Ken Jeong.

Filmography

References

External links
 
 

Actresses from Michigan
People from Bloomfield Hills, Michigan
American film actresses
American women film directors
Film producers from Michigan
American women screenwriters
American film directors of Korean descent
Back Stage West Garland Award recipients
Living people
1965 births
American actresses of Korean descent
DePaul University alumni
20th-century American actresses
21st-century American actresses
Film directors from Michigan
Screenwriters from Michigan
American women film producers